Sveti Lenart is a small settlement in the Municipality of Cerklje na Gorenjskem in the Upper Carniola region of Slovenia.

Name
The name of the settlement was changed from Sveti Lenart na Rebri (literally, 'Saint Leonard on the slope') to Lenart na Rebri (literally, 'Leonard on the slope') in 1955. The name was changed on the basis of the 1948 Law on Names of Settlements and Designations of Squares, Streets, and Buildings as part of efforts by Slovenia's postwar communist government to remove religious elements from toponyms. The name Sveti Lenart was restored in 1994. In the past the German name was Sankt Leonhard.

Church

The local church is dedicated to Saint Leonard and stands isolated above the village. It was first mentioned in 1499, but was extensively rebuilt at various stages, most recently in the 19th century.

References

External links

Sveti Lenart on Geopedia

Populated places in the Municipality of Cerklje na Gorenjskem